I Do is a Philippine romantic reality show that previously aired on ABS-CBN. It is hosted by Judy Ann Santos-Agoncillo and Jayson Gainza. The show premiered on August 30, 2014, replacing Pinoy Big Brother: All In. It aired 9:30 pm (PST) every Saturdays; and 8:45 p.m. (PST) every Sundays. From October 25, 2014, and onwards, the show only aired every Saturdays. Its Sunday timeslot was given to the second season of The Voice of the Philippines.

It aired its last two episodes on November 8 to 15, 2014, showing the final ceremony and the coverage of the grand wedding of the winning couple of the show. In 2015, it was named as Best Reality Show by the 29th PMPC Star Awards For Television held in Manila, Philippines.

Overview

Development
The show first made known in January 2013. Later on, the production team conducted auditions in Davao City, Cebu City, and Manila. Contestants must be couples who were 18 years old and above, and non-cohabiting or not in a live-in relationship.

Concept
Nine couples were secluded in a special village constructed in Cavite. They will undergo love session and counseling conducted by experts and they have to face different challenges that will test their relationships. During the show, aside from Santos-Agoncillo, several experts will guide them for the married life: Life coach Pia Acevedo, and Psychologist and Marriage Counselor Dr. Julian Montano.

Prize
The winning couple will win one million pesos, store franchise, a house and lot, and a grand wedding.

Couples
The following are the nine couples that participated in the show

See also
List of programs broadcast by ABS-CBN

References

External links
 I Do – Official website
 I Do on Facebook
 I Do on Twitter

ABS-CBN original programming
Philippine reality television series
2014 Philippine television series debuts
2014 Philippine television series endings
Filipino-language television shows